Brito Mota (born ) is a Malawian male weightlifter, competing in the 56 kg category and representing Malawi at international competitions. He participated at the 2014 Commonwealth Games in the 56 kg event.

Major competitions

References

1992 births
Living people
Malawian male weightlifters
Place of birth missing (living people)
Weightlifters at the 2014 Commonwealth Games
Commonwealth Games competitors for Malawi